Chethan Manchegowda known as Chethan M (born 11 February 2000) is a social rights and health activist from India. He spent most of his childhood in the social sector. Due to an incident wherein he lost his teacher as she could not procure blood at the right time, he started his own organization titled Aahwahan Foundation Organization with an aim to make sure nobody dies due to the unavailability of blood. His efforts to make the society better made him the "Most Impactful" person in the social sector in India under the age of 21 awarded by Youth For Seva, as well as TEDx speaker. He was also recognized by Ashoka Innovators For Public as a "Youth Venturer" in 2016.

Early life 
Brought up in Bangalore, Chethan did his schooling from Shanthinikethana School and is currently pursuing engineering at  East West Institute of Technology.

Social entrepreneur 
Chethan has co-founded three startups, Chittii, an online handwritten letter service provider cum creative arts marketplace which was started in 2018, Dream Teams, a community based organization in 2015 and Khoon, a not for profit organization in the field of Blood Donation which was started in 2016.

References 

2000 births
Living people
Indian health activists